Benatar is a surname. Notable people with the surname include:

David Benatar (born 1966), professor of philosophy
Doron Ben-Atar (born 1957), historian and playwright
Pat Benatar (born 1953), Grammy-winning singer
Stephen Benatar, English author

Other
The Benatar, a Guardians of the Galaxy spaceship